Erlong Zuoci Wan is a brownish-black honeyed pill used in Traditional Chinese medicine to "replenish the kidney and subdue hyperactivity of the liver". It is used in cases where there is "deficiency of yin of the liver and the kidney marked by tinnitus, impairment of hearing, dizziness and blurred vision". It is sweet and slightly sour in taste.

Chinese classic herbal formula

See also
 Chinese classic herbal formula
 Bu Zhong Yi Qi Wan

References

Traditional Chinese medicine pills